Richard Jeremy Ormston (born 17 November 1961) has been Archdeacon of Northampton since 2014.

Born in 1961, Ormston was educated at Oak Hill Theological College and ordained deacon in 1987 and priest in 1988. After a curacy at St Mary, Rodbourne Cheney, he was Rector of Collingtree with Courteenhall and Milton Malsor from 1991 to 2001 (and Rural Dean of Wootton from 1996 to 2001); then Rector of St Peter, Oundle from 2001 until his appointment as Archdeacon of Northampton. He was also Rural Dean of Oundle and an honorary canon of Peterborough Cathedral from 2003 until 2013. He is additionally Acting Archdeacon of Oakham, 1 December 20216 February 2022.

References

1961 births
Alumni of Oak Hill College
Archdeacons of Northampton
Living people